Fear of the Dark is a BBC Books original novel written by Trevor Baxendale and based on the long-running British science fiction television series Doctor Who. It features the Fifth Doctor, Tegan and Nyssa.

Fear of the Dark was re-released in 2013 for the 50th Anniversary of Doctor Who.

Synopsis
It is 2382. Archaeologists land on Akoshemon's only moon, along with the Doctor and his companions Nyssa and Tegan (who  arrived in the TARDIS by a strange coincidence). They uncover an entity that was seemingly there when Akoshemon destroyed itself in violence; it glories in death and destruction and tries to start more. It seems to have the ability to mentally influence people.

Reception
Fear of the Dark was positively reviewed in the Guardian where it was described as "one of the scariest books I've read."

References

External links
The Cloister Library - Fear of the Dark

2003 British novels
2003 science fiction novels
Past Doctor Adventures
Fifth Doctor novels
Novels by Trevor Baxendale